This page provides a comparison of notable screencasting software, used to record activities on the computer screen. This software is commonly used for desktop recording, gameplay recording and video editing. Screencasting software is typically limited to streaming and recording desktop activity alone, in contrast with a software vision mixer, which has the capacity to mix and switch the output between various input streams.

Comparison by specification

Comparison by features

The following table compares features of screencasting software. The table has seven fields, as follows:
 Product name: Product's name; sometime includes edition if a certain edition is targeted
 Audio: Specifies whether the product supports recording audio commentary on the video
 Entire desktop: Specifies whether product supports recording the entire desktop
 OpenGL: Specifies whether the product supports recording from video games and software that employ OpenGL to render digital image
 Direct3D: Specifies whether the product supports recording from video games or software that employ Direct3D to render digital image
 Editing: Specifies whether the product supports editing recorded video at least to some small extent, such as cropping, trimming or splitting
 Output: Specifies the file format in which the software saves the final video (audio output types are omitted)

See also
 Comparison of webcam software

References

Screencasting software
Lists of software